This is a list of the heads of state of the Gambia, from the independence of the Gambia in 1965 to the present day.

From 1965 to 1970 the head of state under the Constitution of 1965 was the queen of the Gambia, Elizabeth II, who was also the queen of the United Kingdom and the other Commonwealth realms. The monarch was represented in the Gambia by a governor-general. The Gambia became a republic within the Commonwealth under the Constitution of 1970 and the monarch and governor-general were replaced by an executive president.

Monarch (1965–1970)
The succession to the throne was the same as the succession to the British throne.

Governor-general
The governor-general was the representative of the monarch in the Gambia and exercised most of the powers of the monarch. The governor-general was appointed for an indefinite term, serving at the pleasure of the monarch. Since the Gambia was granted independence by the Gambia Independence Act 1964, rather than being first established as a semi-autonomous dominion and later promoted to independence as defined by the Statute of Westminster 1931, the governor-general was to be always appointed solely on the advice of the Cabinet of the Gambia without the involvement of the British government, with the sole exception of John Paul, the former colonial governor, who served as governor-general temporarily until he was replaced by Farimang Mamadi Singateh. In the event of a vacancy the chief justice would have served as the officer administering the government.

Status

First Republic (1970–1994)
Under the Constitution of 1970, the first constitution of the Republic of the Gambia, the president replaced the monarch as executive head of state. The president was elected by the National Assembly for a five-year term. In the event of a vacancy the vice-president served as acting president.

Status

Military rule (1994–1996)
Colonel Yahya Jammeh led a coup d'état which overthrew President Jawara and his government, all political parties and Parliament were dissolved.

Second Republic (1996–present)
Under the current constitution of the Republic of the Gambia, the president is executive head of state. The president is elected by popular vote for a five-year term. In the event of a vacancy, the vice-president will serve as acting president.

Status

Timeline since 1970

Standards

See also

 List of colonial governors of the Gambia
 Lists of office-holders
 Prime Minister of the Gambia

Notes

External links
 World Statesmen – The Gambia
 Rulers.org – The Gambia

Government of the Gambia
Head

Gambia